Hedon, sometimes spelt Heydon, was a parliamentary borough in the East Riding of Yorkshire, represented by two Members of Parliament in the House of Commons briefly in the 13th century and again from 1547 to 1832.

History
The constituency consisted of the market town of Hedon, in Holderness to the east of Hull, which had been of some importance in medieval times but which by 1831 had dwindled to 217 houses and a population of 1,080, and the borough was disfranchised in the Great Reform Act of 1832.

The right of election in Hedon was vested in the burgesses generally, meaning that a high proportion of the male population had the vote. In 1826, when the election was contested, 331 burgesses recorded their votes. Nevertheless, the result was rarely in doubt, Hedon being a classic example of a pocket borough where the influence of the landowner or "patron" was substantial if not absolute. At first the influence seems to have been shared between two families of important local landowners, the Constables of Burton Constable and the Hildyards of Winestead. The patron at the start of the 18th century was Henry Guy; he bequeathed it to his protégé William Pulteney, who not only sat for the borough himself for much of his career but made the other seat available to his cousin and his brother. After Pulteney's death the borough passed to the distinguished admiral Lord Anson, who used his patronage to provide seats for some of his naval colleagues; one of these, Admiral Sir Charles Saunders, inherited the patronage in turn when Anson died.

Members of Parliament

MPs 1547–1640

MPs 1640–1832

Notes

References
Michael Brock, The Great Reform Act (London: Hutchinson, 1973)
D Brunton & D H Pennington, “Members of the Long Parliament” (London: George Allen & Unwin, 1954)
J E Neale, "The Elizabethan House of Commons" (London: Jonathan Cape, 1949)
J Holladay Philbin, "Parliamentary Representation 1832 - England and Wales" (New Haven: Yale University Press, 1965)
Henry Stooks Smith, "The Parliaments of England from 1715 to 1847" (2nd edition, edited by FWS Craig - Chichester: Parliamentary Reference Publications, 1973)
 Frederic A Youngs, jr, "Guide to the Local Administrative Units of England, Vol II" (London: Royal Historical Society, 1991)

Parliamentary constituencies of the East Riding of Yorkshire (defunct)
Constituencies of the Parliament of the United Kingdom established in 1547
Constituencies of the Parliament of the United Kingdom disestablished in 1832
Rotten boroughs
Hedon